Diet Mountain Dew is a no-calorie Mountain Dew that was first introduced in 1986. It was formerly known as "Sugar-Free Mountain Dew" until 1986, when it was given its current name. In 2006 Diet Mountain Dew was reformulated with a new "Tuned Up Taste", using a blend of sucralose, aspartame, and acesulfame potassium as sweeteners. The previous formulation was sweetened exclusively with aspartame.

References

Mountain Dew
Diet drinks
PepsiCo soft drinks
Products introduced in 1988
Citrus sodas